The  is the name of a Japanese aerial lift line, as well as its operator. Opened in 1968, the line climbs Mount Tamoyachi in the Hakkōda Mountains in Aomori, Aomori.  It transports skiers and rime spectators in winter, and hikers in other seasons.

Basic data 
 System: Aerial tramway, 2 track cables and 2 haulage ropes
 Distance: 
 Vertical interval: 
 Maximum gradient: 25°43′
 Operational speed: 5 m/s
 Passenger capacity per a cabin: 101
 Stations: 2

See also 
 List of aerial lifts in Japan

External links 
  Official website

Aerial tramways in Japan
Tourist attractions in Aomori Prefecture
Transport in Aomori (city)
1968 establishments in Japan